A soundtrack by Goran Bregović for Emir Kusturica's 1988 film Time of the Gypsies (Dom za vešanje). Also includes two tracks by Bregović from Ademir Kenović's 1989 film Kuduz.

Track listing
  Ederlezi 
  Scena pojavljivanja majke 
  Scena Perhanove pogibije 
  Kustino oro 
  Borino oro 
  Glavna tema 
  Tango 
  Pjesma 
  Talijanska 
  Ederlezi

Several of the pieces in the soundtrack to the film can also be heard in the movie Borat.

Certifications

Goran Bregović albums
1988 soundtrack albums
Komuna (company) albums
Fantasy film soundtracks
Drama film soundtracks